Rhamphophila is a genus of crane fly in the family Limoniidae.

Distribution
New Zealand.

Species
R. lyrifera Edwards, 1923
R. sinistra (Hutton, 1900)

References

Limoniidae
Diptera of Australasia